The 1908 VPI football team represented Virginia Agricultural and Mechanical College and Polytechnic Institute in the 1908 college football season. The team was led by their head coach R. M. Brown and finished with a record of five wins and four losses (5–4).

Schedule

Players
The following players were members of the 1908 football team according to the roster published in the 1909 edition of The Bugle, the Virginia Tech yearbook.

References

VPI
Virginia Tech Hokies football seasons
VPI football